Simone Andrea Ganz (born 21 September 1993) is an Italian professional footballer who plays as a striker for  club Latina on loan from Triestina.

Club career

Milan 
Ganz started playing football as a child at the Masseroni Marchese football academy in Milan, before joining A.C. Milan's youth system at the start of the 2008–09 season. He made his professional debut with the first team on 1 November 2011, coming on as a substitute for Robinho in a UEFA Champions League group stage match against BATE Borisov, which ended in a 1–1 draw.

For the 2013–14 season, he was loaned out to Prima Divisione club Lumezzane. However, the deal was cut short during the January transfer window and he subsequently joined Barletta on another loan for the remainder of the season.

Como 
At the start of the 2014–15 season, Ganz joined Lega Pro club Como.

Juventus 
After scoring 16 goals in Serie B for Como, Juventus signed Ganz on a four-year deal in May 2016. He was immediately sent out on a season-long loan to Hellas Verona.

Ascoli
On 28 September 2020, he joined Mantova on loan.

On 31 August 2021, he was loaned to Lecco on Serie C.

Triestina
On 26 July 2022, Ganz signed a two-year contract with Triestina. On 31 January 2023, Ganz was loaned by Latina, with an option to buy.

International career 
Ganz won 5 caps and scored one goal with the Italy under-19 side in 2011.

Personal life
Ganz is the son of former footballer Maurizio Ganz. He is of Austrian origin through his father.

Career statistics

Club 
Updated 24 March 2021

References

External links 
 International caps at figc.it 

1993 births
Living people
Footballers from Genoa
Italian people of Austrian descent
Italian footballers
Italy youth international footballers
Association football forwards
Serie B players
Serie C players
A.C. Milan players
F.C. Lumezzane V.G.Z. A.S.D. players
A.S.D. Barletta 1922 players
Como 1907 players
Juventus F.C. players
Hellas Verona F.C. players
Delfino Pescara 1936 players
Ascoli Calcio 1898 F.C. players
Mantova 1911 players
Calcio Lecco 1912 players
U.S. Triestina Calcio 1918 players
Latina Calcio 1932 players